Lumpen can refer to:
 Lumpen (magazine), an American art and politics magazine
Lumpen journal, A Journal of Poor and Working Class writing
 Lumpenproletariat, a term in Marxist sociology
 Lumpenbourgeoisie
 Swedish slang for military service, adopted by armed forces as a near-formal word
 LUMPENS, a South Korean visual art studio.